Prague, the capital of today's Czech Republic, has been for over a thousand years the centre and the biggest city of the Czech lands. Notable people who were born or died, studied, lived or saw their success in Prague are listed below.

The arts

 Auguste Hauschner (1850-1924) —  German writer, born in Prague
H. G. Adler (1910–1988) — German-language writer; born and lived in Prague
 Filip Albrecht (born 1977) — lyricist, film producer, writer; lives in Prague
 Jana Andrsová (born 1939) — actress and ballerina; born and lives in Prague
 Lída Baarová (1914–2000) — actress; lived and died in Prague
 Max Brod (1884–1968) — German-language writer; born and lived in Prague
 Karel Čapek (1890–1938) — writer; lived and died in Prague
 Gene Deitch (born 1924) — American-born animator; lives in Prague
 Emmy Destinn (1878–1930) — operatic soprano; born in Prague
 Antonín Dvořák (1841–1904) — composer; lived most of his life in Prague
 Miloš Forman (1932–2018) — film director,  won twice Academy Award for Best Director; studied and lived in Prague
 Karel Gott (1939–2019) — singer; lived in Prague
 Jaroslav Hašek (1883–1923) — writer, humorist and satirist; lived in Prague for most of his life, described the city in many stories
 Václav Havel (1936–2011) — dramatist, writer and politician; President of Czechoslovakia  and Czech republic (its first; 1993–2003); born and lived in Prague
 Maxim Havlíček — painter; born in Prague
 Vladimír Holan (1905–1980) — poet; born, lived and died in Prague
 Jiří Hošta (born 1978) — writer, essayist, photographer; lives in Prague
 Bohumil Hrabal (1914–1997) — writer; lived and died in Prague
 Leoš Janáček (1854–1928) — composer; studied in Prague
 Fanny Janauschek (1830–1904) — actress; migrated to the United States in 1867
 Franz Kafka (1883–1924) — German-language fiction writer; born and lived in Prague
 Tomas Kalnoky (born 1980) — guitarist, singer; born in Prague
 Egon Erwin Kisch (1885–1948) – German-language journalist and writer; born, lived, and died in Prague
 Stefan Kisyov (born 1963) — novelist; lives in Prague
 Daria Klimentová (born 1971) - ballet dancer; born and raised in Prague
 Paul Kornfeld (1889–1942) — German-language playwright and novelist; born and lived in Prague
 Ivan Kral (born 1948) — guitarist, singer, record producer and film director; born in Prague
 Milan Kundera (born 1929) — writer; studied, lectured at the Academy of Performing Arts in Prague
 Leopold Eugen Měchura (1804–1870) — composer
 Jiří Menzel (1938-2020) — film director (his first feature film, Closely Watched Trains (1966) won the Academy Award for Best Foreign Language Film); born in Prague
 Wolfgang Amadeus Mozart (1756–1791) — composer; some of his best opera successes were during his time in Prague
 Alfons Mucha (1860–1939) — Art Nouveau painter and decorative artist; spent last decades of his life in Prague
 Josef Václav Myslbek (1848–1922) — sculptor; born in Prague and creator of the Wenceslas Monument in Prague's Wenceslas Square
 Zuzana Navarová (1959–2004) — singer; lived and died in Prague
 Jože Plečnik (1872–1957) — Slovene architect; built several churches and parts of the Prague Castle
 Rainer Maria Rilke (1875–1926) — German-language poet; born and studied in Prague
 Karel Roden (born 1962) — actor; lives in Prague
 Jan Saudek (born 1935) — art photographer; born and lives in Prague
 Jaroslav Seifert (1901–1986) — poet and recipient of the Nobel Prize in Literature (1984); lived in Prague
 Bedřich Smetana (1824–1884) — composer; lived and died in Prague
 Kamila Špráchalová (born 1971) — stage and television actress 
 Jiří Suchý (born 1931) — actor, singer, playwright, writer; born and lives in Prague
 Bertha von Suttner (1843–1914) — novelist, pacifist activist and writer, recipient of the Nobel Peace Prize (1905)
 Vladimír Svozil (born 1966) — painter
 Johannes Urzidil (1896–1970) — German-language writer; born and lived in Prague, described the city in many stories (The Lost Beloved, 1956, Prague Triptych, 1960)
 Marja Vallila (1950–2018) — sculptor
 Robert Vano (born 1948) — art photographer; lives in Prague
 Sonja Vectomov (born 1979) — composer, musician; lives in Prague
 Felix Weltsch (1884–1964) — German-language writer; born and lived in Prague
 Robert Weltsch (1891–1982) — German-language journalist; born and lived in Prague
 Franz Werfel (1890–1945) — German-language writer; born and lived in Prague
 Jan Werich (1905–1980) — actor, singer, playwright, writer; born, lived and died in Prague
 David Woodard (born 1964) — American-born writer and businessman; lives in Prague
Walter Trier (1890–1951) — illustrator; born in Prague

Monarchs

 Charles IV (1316–1378) — Holy Roman Emperor; under his rule the Charles University in Prague was established and the Charles Bridge was built; made the city his main seat of government
 Rudolf II (1552–1612) — Holy Roman Emperor; made the city the capital of the Habsburg Empire; attracted both scientists and charlatans to Prague

The sciences
 Bernard Bolzano (1781–1848) — mathematician, logician, philosopher, Catholic theologian
 Tycho Brahe (1546–1601) — astronomer; spent end of life near Prague
 Carl Ferdinand Cori (1896–1984) — biochemist,  recipient of the Nobel Prize in Physiology or Medicine (1947)
 Gerty Cori (1896–1957) — biochemist,  recipient of the Nobel Prize in Physiology or Medicine (1947)
 Karl Deutsch (1912–1992) — social scientist, political scientist
 Albert Einstein (1879–1955) — physicist, served as professor at the German part of the Charles University in Prague (1911–1912)
Nikola Tesla (1856–1943) — inventor, electrical engineer, mechanical engineer, and futurist, studied at Charles University in Prague (1880)
 Jaroslav Heyrovský (1890–1967) — chemist; inventor of the polarographic method and recipient of the Nobel Prize in Chemistry (1959); born, lived most of his life and died in Prague
 Antonín Holý (1936–2012) — chemist, pharmacologist
 Jan Janský (1873–1921) — serologist, neurologist, psychiatrist
 Johannes Kepler (1571–1630) — astronomer; in 1601, he succeeded Tycho Brahe as imperial mathematician and the next eleven years lectured for several years in Prague and published his paper on Doppler effect there
 Enoch Heinrich Kisch (1841-1918), balneologist

In sports

František Getreuer (1906–1945), swimmer and Olympic water polo player, killed in Dachau concentration camp
Radko Gudas (born 1990), ice hockey player
Ladislav Hecht (1909–2004), Czechoslovak-American tennis player 
Tomáš Hertl (born in 1993), ice hockey player; born and raised in Prague
Martina Navratilova (born 1956), tennis player; 18 times Grand Slam champion, born in Prague
Pavel Nedvěd (born 1972), footballer; Ballon d'Or 2003 winner; lived and played in Prague
Felix Pipes (born 1887), tennis player, Olympic medalist
František Plánička (1904–1996), footballer, captain of the Czechoslovakia national football team
Tomáš Rosický (born 1980), footballer; born in Prague
Jan Soukup (born 1979), karateka and kickboxer; born in Prague
Daniel Vladař (born 1997), ice hockey goaltender, born in Prague
Jakub Vrána (born 1996), ice hockey player; born and raised in Prague
Václav Žáček (born 1978), personal watercraft extreme sports athlete; born in Prague
Emil Zátopek (1922–2000), athlete, Olympic winner; lived and died in Prague

Other fields

Vladimir Balthasar (1897–1978), entomologist, naturalist and ornithologist
Karel Baxa (1863–1938), politician; mayor of Prague for almost two decades
Adolph Aloys von Braun (1818–1904), diplomat and statesman
Jan van der Croon (1600–1665), Dutch soldier; military commander of Prague 1652–1665 
Charles Fried (1935), United States Solicitor General, 1985–89
Reinhard Heydrich (1904–1942), Nazi general and protector; assassinated in Prague during Operation Anthropoid while serving as governor of the occupied country
Jan Hus (1369–1415), priest, philosopher, reformer; most-important preaching done in Prague
Jerome of Prague (1379–1416), scholastic philosopher, theologian, reformer, and professor
Gershom ben Solomon Kohen (d. 1544), early printer of Hebrew books and founder of the Gersonides (printers)
Pyotra Krecheuski (1879–1928), Belarusian statesman and president of the Rada of the Belarusian Democratic Republic in exile; died in Prague
František Křižík (1847–1941), inventor, electrical engineer and entrepreneur  set up his company in Prague
Judah Loew ben Bezalel (1525–1609), Talmudic scholar, Jewish mystic and philosopher; lived most of his life in Prague
Tomáš Garrigue Masaryk (1850–1937), philosopher, politician; lived in Prague for a substantial part of his life
Jan Patočka (1907–1977), philosopher; born, lived and died in Prague
Vasil Zacharka (1877–1943), Belarusian statesman and the second president of the Belarusian Democratic Republic in exile; died in Prague
Jan Žižka (circa 1360–1424), general and Hussite leader; participated in start of the rebellion in Prague, later defended the city against Crusaders in the first anti-Hussite crusade of the Hussite Wars

Notes 

Lists of people by city

Prague-related lists
Prague